Smartex Godfrey Tambala (born 30 July 1965) is a Malawian former long-distance runner.

Smartex competed in the marathon at the 1992 Summer Olympics in Barcelona, finishing 63rd. His personal best in the event was 2:17:18, achieved in 1991, which is also the current Malawian national record. At the 1994 Commonwealth Games in Victoria, Smartex crossed the line in 17th place in the marathon, just ahead of fellow African athlete Moses Matabane of Lesotho.

References

1965 births
Living people
Malawian male long-distance runners
Olympic athletes of Malawi
Athletes (track and field) at the 1992 Summer Olympics
Commonwealth Games competitors for Malawi
Athletes (track and field) at the 1994 Commonwealth Games